Radha Poovendran is a Professor of electrical engineering at the University of Washington in Seattle, where he is Chair of the Department of Electrical & Computer Engineering, and founding director of the Network Security Lab. He was named a Fellow of the Institute of Electrical and Electronics Engineers (IEEE) in 2015 for his contributions to security in cyber-physical systems.

References

External links

20th-century births
Living people
Indian electrical engineers
University of Washington faculty
Fellow Members of the IEEE
Year of birth missing (living people)
Place of birth missing (living people)